Ocean Heights is a supertall residential skyscraper in Dubai Marina, Dubai, UAE. The tower is designed by Andrew Bromberg of Aedas. The building was topped out on 22 December 2009, and completed in 2010. 

As of 2022, Ocean Heights is the seventh-tallest residential building in Dubai and 20th-tallest residential building in the world.

The tower, with its unique curves and twisting motion as it ascends, is actually the third version of the tower proposed by DAMAC Properties Co. The first version had the tower at a much shorter 38 floors, the second had 50. The 83-floor tower houses more than 519 condominiums and is located along Al Sufouh Road in Dubai Marina.

See also
 List of tallest buildings in Dubai
 List of tallest buildings in the United Arab Emirates
 List of tallest residential buildings
 List of twisted buildings

References

External links

 View Tower info, Images and Floor Plans of Ocean Heights
 Ocean Heights on CTBUH Skyscraper Center

Residential skyscrapers in Dubai
Andrew Bromberg buildings
Aedas buildings
Residential buildings completed in 2010
High-tech architecture
2010 establishments in the United Arab Emirates
Twisted buildings and structures